Gonzalo Monty Manibog (14 February 1930 – 12 August 2016) was a Filipino wrestler. He competed in the men's freestyle featherweight at the 1952 Summer Olympics.

In 1976 he became the first Asian-American to become an elected official in Southern California when he won a seat in the Monterey Park City Council.

References

External links
 

1930 births
2016 deaths
Filipino male sport wrestlers
Olympic wrestlers of the Philippines
Wrestlers at the 1952 Summer Olympics
Place of birth missing